The Transit Authority of River City (TARC) is the major public transportation provider for the Louisville, Kentucky, United States metro area, which includes parts of Southern Indiana. This includes the suburbs of Clark County, and Floyd County in Southern Indiana. TARC is publicly funded and absorbed various earlier private mass transit companies in Louisville, the largest of which was the Louisville Transit Company.

TARC began bus operations in 1974. As of 2023, TARC operates a fleet of 227 accessible buses, which runs year-round. TARC also operates many specialized routes providing transportation to major local employers, educational institutions and recreational events. TARC has explored other forms of public transit, including light rail, but as of 2023 provides only bus service.

History 
The Transit Authority of River City was created in 1971 after 1970 legislation authorized city, and county governments to operate mass-transit systems using local funding. At the time, public transit was still being provided in Louisville by the private Louisville Transit Company. The Louisville Transit Company had long operated mass transit lines in Louisville, converted from electric trolleys to diesel buses in the late 1940s, and changing its name from the Louisville Railway Company in 1947.

Following a trend seen in cities across America, the company had seen annual ridership decline from 84 million in 1920 to 14 million in 1970. The ridership was no longer enough for to cover operating expenses and in 1971 it posted its first-ever loss. In 1972 the company announced it would cease operations on September 1, 1974.

The local government began subsidizing fares in July 1973, but this was not enough to make Louisville Transit Company profitable. At about the same time, Bridge Transit Co., which provided mass transit between Louisville and Jeffersonville, ceased operations due to lack of revenue, clearly setting the stage for a metropolitan area without any private mass transit companies.

In 1974, voters approved a controversial referendum allowing for an increased occupational tax to fund mass transit, which was pushed for by then-mayor Harvey Sloane. Combined with a federal grant, this was enough for TARC to purchase the Louisville Transit Company, buy new buses, reduce fares, and extend new service lines. TARC bought up the remaining mass transit companies in the area; Blue Motor Coach Lines, which served outlying areas, in 1976 and the Daisy Line, connecting New Albany and Louisville, in 1983.

In 1993, TARC experimented with a "water taxi" service connecting the Belle of Louisville wharf and Towboat Annie's Restaurant in Jeffersonville. During the 1990s and early 2000s, TARC advocated extensive funding to build and operate light rail system in the Louisville area, but despite wide press coverage, the plans never went past planning stages.

In February 1994, an audit committee headed by future political candidate Bruce Lunsford revealed TARC had been mismanaging funds and was on pace to deplete its once-large trust fund due to skyrocketing expenses such as door-to-door services for the disabled as well as rates of spending on personal services and fringe benefits for administrators that was much higher than in transit companies for similar sized cities. In the fallout of the audit, TARC's executive director resigned and fares were nearly doubled before year's end.

In August 2011, TARC's new $4.5 million, 17,700 square-foot, Maintenance and Training building received Gold LEED (Leadership in Energy and Environmental Design) Certification.

Starting in 2004, TARC purchased hybrids, and by 2008 started purchasing clean diesel buses for a cleaner, greener fleet. By late Winter 2013, TARC added 16 more clean diesels. Then, by mid-Summer 2013, 11 hybrids were added, bringing TARC's hybrid total to 32. By Fall 2013, TARC added 21 clean diesel commuter buses, then as of Fall 2014 TARC added 12 more clean diesels; some of them are WiFi-enabled and have comfortable seating. TARC has recently put 12 additional updated buses on the road with 13 more due to arrive by late 2016. This brings their clean diesel total to 82 when the other 13 arrive. There will be 95. All-electric buses have been circulating downtown Louisville since early 2015, and 6 mieehit the road in summer 2016. These buses operate on one local route. Serving the Iroquois neighborhood, and Iroquois Park. These buses are not fare-free, and seat up to 42-passengers. These buses share the 8th Street charging station with one of the trolley routes. according to The Courier-Journal. There is also one other charging station in downtown Louisville. Located at 3rd and York Sts. These buses will have a 30-passenger seating capacity, and be able to operate for up to two hours on a single charge. These buses, like the old trolleys, will be fare-free. On November 5, 2019. TARC will celebrate 45 years of service. Since 2016 TARC has added 45 more clean diesels, and one hybrid.  As of January 6, 2020 Tarc  launched the region, and state of Kentucky's first bus rapid transit line. The line  runs from downtown Louisville, to Valley Station. The fares are the same as a local bus. In 2021 TARC took delivery of 47 more Clean Diesel buses 2 Gillig BRT's and 45 Gillig Advantage's. 13 of them hit the road for regular routing, and 2 of them for the Dixie Highway Rapid Line in summer of 2021. In fall of 2021. 15 more hit the road, and by late fall to early winter 2021. The other 17 will be on the road. (See 2021 bus roster). These buses were purchased with the help of state, and federal funds totaling 22 million dollars. 17.3 million from FTA 5339(b), and 4.7 million from money the state of Kentucky received from a settlement with German automaker Volkswagen. Due to emissions cheating. Fast forward to sunmer of 2022, and the annual report for FY 23 which starts 7/1/2022 is out. There are big plans for FY 23. First TARC plans to grow its EV fleet even larger, second  14 more Clean Diesels are on order. Delivery is set for sometime in the 2nd quarter of FY23. The new Battery Electric Buses do not have an ETA for delivery as of yet, but they're not going to be the 2015, and 2016 Proterras.TARC has on order 2 Gillig Advantage plus Battery Electric buses, and 6 NOVA Bus LFSe's. These 8 new EVs will have a range of up to 150 miles, or up to 9 hrs before needing to charge. This rating is based on optimal conditions, and speeds of up to 35 mph.These buses were ordered, and paid for using Federal 5339 grant funding, and funding set aside from Federal Fiscal Year 2021 section 5307 UAF funding totaling $8.9 million dollars.These  buses will help TARC continue to operate a clean, environmentally friendly, and sustainable. fleet.

Administration 

TARC purchased Louisville's Union Station for $2 million in 1977, the year after the former train station had ceased rail operations. The trainyard was replaced with a large maintenance facility for TARC buses and the former train station is now TARC's administrative headquarters. In 2003, TARC did a major remodeling of Union Station for the first time since it purchased the facility. The renovation cost $2.1 million.

TARC is administered by an eight-member board. TARC had a budget of $67.8 million for the 2008–09 fiscal year. Fares only cover about 12% of TARC's operating expenses; the rest is paid for by Jefferson County's occupational tax, federal aid and some other minor sources.
 The occupational tax is 0.002 it makes up about two-thirds of TARC's operating expenses in any given year. The actual total varies due to availability of federal grants and fares collected. In 2002, TARC had 710 employees, 460 of whom were bus drivers.

Some funding comes from a transportation trust fund kept by TARC. In 1992, the fund contained $28 million, which a local alderman claimed made TARC the "Cadillac" of America's bus systems, and unsuccessfully proposed raiding it to fund the Louisville Free Public Library. The fund declined from $34 million in 1989 to $13 million in 1994, prompting severe cutbacks and rate hikes that year.

Fleet 
As of 2020, TARC has a fleet of 227 buses. 32 are hybrid buses, which combine a traditional diesel engine and an electric motor to reduce emissions and eliminate tailpipe exhaust during acceleration, but cost nearly twice as much as a conventional bus. The hybrids were provided through Federal highway bill earmarks by U.S. Senator Jim Bunning. In 2007, a new TARC bus cost $285,000, while a hybrid bus cost $504,000. Now a New clean diesel costs $405,000 dollars a bus while a hybrid costs $600,000 dollars a bus. Tarc Also operates a fleet of 17 electric buses which cost a lot more than the hybrids. These buses burn cleaner than a diesel bus, and have zero emissions. Which means  less diesel exhaust smoke has been emitted into the air.

In October 2010, TARC announced that the hybrid bus fleet would grow to 21, with the addition of 9 new buses, with a grant of $3.9 million, from the Federal Transit Authority's Clean Fuels Bus and Bus Facilities Program. A previous grant through the federal stimulus program paid for nine hybrid buses that arrived in July 2010.

All buses are equipped with "kneeling" bus technology that makes them easier to board, and a wheelchair lift. TARC once required disabled riders to use a special service with smaller buses that had to be scheduled in advance, but all regular buses were made accessible following protests in 1986.

Current bus fleet

Services 

TARC operates a series of city buses that serve throughout the Louisville area. TARC claims over 7,000+ bus stops, although only about 200 of them have benches and rain shelters—the rest simply have a sign indicating the location is a bus stop. The stops are served by 29 weekday and weekend routes, 4 express routes with weekday service only, totalling 33 routes. The daily routes are named for the primary road they serve. On the daily routes, there is no more than hour between scheduled buses at any stop, and on weekdays on the busiest routes have even less time between stops. Most of the daily routes have existed under the same name and number for decades, although their routes have almost all been extended to provide access to suburban locations.

TARC operates various circulators providing access to hospitals, Downtown Louisville and art galleries. Since 1999, TARC has operated a shuttle service for the University of Louisville's main campus. It operates two routes shuttling workers to Worldport, the hub of United Parcel Service and one of Louisville's largest employers. In 2007, TARC launched a program called "Ride to Safety" which allows domestic abuse victims to board TARC buses to be given transportation to a shelter.

They also operate a system of diesel-powered rubber-tired buses designed in the style of early 20th century streetcars that act as circulators in the downtown hotel and shopping districts and on certain days are used to provide special shuttle services in other shopping and entertainment areas. The tourist trolleys began operation in November 1987 and their role and fare has varied over the years as funding has allowed. By the end of 2014, 10 new all-electric buses will be in operation. The first of 10 has arrived already, and is slated to begin testing soon.

TARC and its predecessor provided shuttle access to the Kentucky Derby and Kentucky Oaks since the 1950s, but in 2008 new federal rules required the racetrack, Churchill Downs, to negotiate with private companies to provide service. The shuttle operation transported tens of thousands of people each year and provided TARC with over $200,000 of annual revenue. TARC provides service to some other local events, including Thunder over Louisville and the Kentucky State Fair.

Through a program called "Bikes on Board", TARC has bike racks installed on the front of all its full-size buses, each with the capacity to hold two to 3 bicycles. The program began in 2001, and by 2004 all buses were equipped. In 2005, TARC reported an average of 6,000 riders a month used the bike racks.

Old fares 
The standard fare became $1 in 1994, up from $0.85 for peak hours and $0.50 for off-peak hours. On July 1, 2007, it was raised to $1.25. In June 2008 the adult fare was raised to $1.50 to help defray the increased cost of fuel. Since July 1, 2012, the adult fare has been $1.75. Starting in 2018, fareboxes will be updated. The amount for a one-way adult fare will be unchanged. Smartcards will be accepted for payment, with the fare discounted to $1.50, while those without smartcards will have to provide exact change. Discounts are offered to senior citizens and high school students. A "day tripper" one-day pass can be purchased for $3.50 while boarding the bus (TARC3 is currently not participating but will be phased in at a later time). Express fares are $2.75, or $1 with a bus pass currently. Children under 6 with a fare-paying rider pay no fare, limited to 3.

New fares 
NOTE: since late April 2020, all fares are free because of ongoing COVID-19 pandemic, and riders must wear masks besides boarding from rear door. Once the operator shields are added, fare collection will resume.

Update Fare collection has since resumed, and all driver shields are up. All express routes with the exception of Routes 17X Fern Creek Express, 31X Middletown Express, and 40X Jeffersontown express have been discontinued. Express Pass, and Express fare have also been discontinued per August 2020.

As of January 7, 2019 TARC has started their Automated fare collection system, and added new magnetic fare cards. TARC also launched a new app as well. The fares are as follows $1.75 full cash fare one way. With the new MYTARC fare cards $1.50.   MYTARC 24 hr Card. $3.50 local, $15 for the 168-hour local. for $50 for 30 day local, The new smart card youth summer pass became available late May 2019. For seniors, and persons with disabilities. The Fare is still 80 cents full cash fare or with smart card. 10 trip cards are available for $8. Note:Express fares for seniors, and persons with disabilities  Mobile ticketing will be available 01/13/2020. Pricing will be as follows. With smartcard, and reduced smartcard its $0.80, and $1.50 for local, and rapid, and   With the TARC Mobile app launched in the spring of 2019. All fares, reduced or not, will be $1.50, as does express fare. This is per TARC Mgmt, and customer service.

Bus Rapid Transit 
 ((see 2021 bus roster))

TARC debuted the region, and state of Kentucky's first Bus Rapid Transit line on January 6, 2020. It has 37 brand new distinctly branded stops, and 11 new distinctly branded silver, and blue buses. Service will be 15–30 minutes 20 hours a day, 7 days a week. 20 minute service will be from 4:00am–5:30am, and 7:00pm–12:00am, with 15 minute service from 5:30am–7:00pm. Monday-Friday. Saturday, and Sunday will be 30 minute service from 4:30-7:00am,
and 20 minute service from 7:00am–7:00pm 30 minute service from 7:00pm–12:00am Midnight.

Update: as of 6/12/2022 service changes have been placed into affect. The Dixie Rapid bus has been cut back to 12:00am midnight 7 days a week. Meaning service will be from 4:00am–12:00am Monday-Friday. There won't be any changes to weekend service.

This route will begin at 2nd and Market, and end at Dixie Gardens. These buses will be full of modern technology, including the ability to control the traffic signals at select cue jump lanes. As well as fuel saving technology,  and it  will save time on your bus ride. This new route was created as part of the nearly 3 year $35 million New Dixie Highway   project. That added medians, and realigned a short portion at the corner of Dixie, and Broadway, and when final paving is done this spring  it will make Dixie Highway safer to travel.

See also 
 Transportation in Louisville, Kentucky
 Roads in Louisville, Kentucky

References

External links
TARC officials pondering broad look at services, routes
Official TARC Website
TARC Awarded $4.4 Million Federal Grant for All-Electric Buses—Louisville.gov September 19, 2012
TARC Awarded $9 million in federal grants—Business First October 28, 2010
TARC Bike Rack Rap on YouTube
1961 system map
Tarc annual report 

Bus transportation in Kentucky
Bus transportation in Indiana
Transportation in Louisville, Kentucky
Transit agencies in Indiana
Louisville